Lotta on Troublemaker Street (also known as The Children on Troublemaker Street) is a Swedish novel and picture book series by Rabén & Sjögren, which is written by Astrid Lindgren.

Plot 
Lotta is a little girl who is three years old at the beginning of the book series. She lives with her siblings Jonas and Mia Maria and her parents on Troublemaker Street. Lotta's next-door neighbor is an elderly woman who Lotta simply calls Aunt Berg. Lotta often visits her. One day, when Lotta has an argument with her mother because she does not want to wear her scratchy sweater, she even moves into Aunt Berg's attic. But she feels lonely in the attic, so she decides to come back home with her father, when he visits her. Lotta often plays with her siblings Mia Maria and Jonas, but does not always want to follow their rules, so the games often end abruptly.

Background 
The stories about Lotta take place in the late 1950s. The illustrations were made by Ilon Wikland. The role model for her illustrations of Lotta was her own daughter Anna. 
 In the theme park Astrid Lindgren's World, some locations of the books can be visited.

Characters

Works

Films about The Children on Troublemaker Street 

In the early 1990s two films were made about the life of Lotta and her siblings.

The script was written by Johanna Hald and Astrid Lindgren. Astrid Lindgren had a major influence on the script for the films. However, she was not present during the filming. The leading actress Grete Havnesköld was chosen by the director Johanna Hald. Hald had originally intended to make a movie about Lindgren's picture book The Day Adam Got Mad. She had already written the script for it, but Lindgren did not think the script was good enough and turned it down. In return, Hald was allowed to shoot the films about Lotta.

Reception 
Maria Hunstig of the Vogue magazine describes Lotta as her heroine. She praises Lotta’s healthy self-confidence and her 'I can do anything' attitude, which makes Lotta far ahead of the common image of girls of the late 1950s. Lotta still works as a clever role model today.

Christina Steinlein from Focus praises the picture book Lotta’s Bike. She believes that the story is told with a lot of humor, is illustrated in a wonderfully non-teaching way and belongs on the children's bookshelf..

Ingrid Löbner advises parents in her guidebook Gelassene Eltern-Glückliche Kinder: Mit mehr Leichtigkeit und Entspanntheit durch die ersten sechs Lebensjahre to look at Astrid Lindgren's picture book Lotta’s Christmas Surprise in order to be able to empathize with how four-year-old children feel, how they see the world, what thoughts they have and what activities they are already capable of.  Gabriele Cromme adds that the picture book contradicts the traditional understanding of the roles of girls and boys. Boys are perceived as "active and adventurous" and girls as "passive and immobile". Lotta is "active and adventurous".

References

Book series introduced in 1956
Works by Astrid Lindgren
20th-century Swedish literature
Swedish-language literature
1950s children's books
1960s children's books
1970s children's books
1990s children's books
Rabén & Sjögren books
Picture books
Series of children's books
Aladdin Paperbacks books